Patrick Joseph Sheehan (1 March 193310 August 2020) was an Irish Fine Gael politician who served as a Teachta Dála (TD) for the Cork South-West constituency from 1981 to 2002 and 2007 to 2011.

Career
Before entering politics, Sheehan worked as an auctioneer, merchant, and farmer, and used his experiences in these fields to establish his political base. He was involved in politics for more than 50 years. In 1967, he was elected to Cork County Council for the first time. He was a prominent campaigner for rural rights. He once clashed with Taoiseach Charles Haughey in the chamber of Dáil Éireann.

Sheehan was first elected to the Dáil at the 1981 general election, and retained his Cork South-West seat until losing it at the 2002 general election. He regained his seat at the 2007 general election at the age of 74. He served as Fine Gael's Deputy spokesperson on Agriculture with special responsibility for Forestry until 2010. He and fellow Fine Gael TD Jim O'Keeffe were noted for their cooperation within their constituency that successfully foiled Fianna Fáil's efforts to garner another seat in west Cork. Sheehan's support base was concentrated in Goleen, which is approximately 400 km away from the Dáil. Because of this, he would quip that he was the TD "furthest from the Dáil and nearest to the White House".

Sheehan retired from politics at the 2011 general election. He was essentially succeeded as Cork South-West TD by Noel Harrington.

On 20 September 2010, Sheehan resigned his position as Fine Gael's Deputy spokesperson on Agriculture and apologised for being under the influence of alcohol and threatening a Garda officer after she prevented him from driving while leaving Leinster House in July 2010. He was reported to have threatened her career if she disrupted him. His party leader, Enda Kenny, told a sergeant to "ignore what Sheehan had said".

Personal life
Sheehan was married to Frances. Together they had four children.

He died on 10 August 2020, aged 87, one week after his wife died.

References

1933 births
2020 deaths
Charles Haughey
Fine Gael TDs
Irish farmers
Local councillors in County Cork
Members of the 22nd Dáil
Members of the 23rd Dáil
Members of the 24th Dáil
Members of the 25th Dáil
Members of the 26th Dáil
Members of the 27th Dáil
Members of the 28th Dáil
Members of the 30th Dáil